Lucius Laberius Maximus  was a governor of Roman Egypt in 83 CE, and prefect of the imperial bodyguard, known as the Praetorian Guard, during the reign of Roman Emperor Domitian, in 84 CE. 

Prior to achieving these positions, Laberius Maximus had also successfully completed a term as Praefectus annonae, or the prefect in charge of the grain supply of Rome. Maximus attained all three of the highest offices open to members of the equestrian class.

Family 
Maximus was the son of another Lucius Laberius Maximus, who served as an aedile of Lanuvium.

The name of Maximus' wife is not known; however, his son has been identified. Manius Laberius Maximus, was a significant senator and military figure during the reigns of the Emperors Domitian and Trajan. Through this son Maximus was the paternal grandfather of the rich heiress Laberia Hostilia Crispina and ancestor to the Roman Empress Bruttia Crispina.

Sources

Further reading 
 Hans-Georg Pflaum, Les carrières procuratoriennes équestres sous le Haut-Empire romain (Paris, 1960), pp. 102–104, no. 43
 André Piganiol, "Le codicille impérial du papyrus de Berlin 8334", Comptes rendus des séances de l'Académie des Inscriptions et Belles-Lettres, 91 (1947) pp. 376-387

Roman governors of Egypt
1st-century Roman governors of Egypt
1st-century Romans
People from Lanuvio
Maximus, Lucius
Flavian dynasty
Praetorian prefects
Praefecti annonae